JRG may refer to:

Revolutionary Government Junta of El Salvador (Junta Revolucionaria de Gobierno)
Young Radicals of the Left (Jeunes Radicaux de Gauche)
Jangareddygudem